In Greek mythology, Periclymene or Periklymene (Ancient Greek: Περικλύμενη means 'renowned') may refer to two distinct characters: 

 Periclymene, a Minyan princess as the daughter of King Minyas of Orchomenus and Euryanassa . She became the mother of  Admetus, Lycurgus, Eidomene (wife of Amythaon), Periopis (mother of Patroclus) and Antigona (mother of Asterius), by King Pheres of Pherae. Periclymene or Clymene was also said to have Iphiclus, Alcimede and possibly Clymenus by Phylacus of Phylace. Other sources would identify Iphiclus as her son by Cephalus, son of Deion and brother of Phylacus. 
 Periclymene, one of the maenads named in a vase painting.

Notes

References 

 Apollodorus, The Library with an English Translation by Sir James George Frazer, F.B.A., F.R.S. in 2 Volumes, Cambridge, MA, Harvard University Press; London, William Heinemann Ltd. 1921. . Online version at the Perseus Digital Library. Greek text available from the same website.
Gaius Julius Hyginus, Fabulae from The Myths of Hyginus translated and edited by Mary Grant. University of Kansas Publications in Humanistic Studies. Online version at the Topos Text Project.
Gaius Valerius Flaccus, Argonautica translated by Mozley, J H. Loeb Classical Library Volume 286. Cambridge, MA, Harvard University Press; London, William Heinemann Ltd. 1928. Online version at theio.com.
Gaius Valerius Flaccus, Argonauticon. Otto Kramer. Leipzig. Teubner. 1913. Latin text available at the Perseus Digital Library.
Pausanias, Description of Greece with an English Translation by W.H.S. Jones, Litt.D., and H.A. Ormerod, M.A., in 4 Volumes. Cambridge, MA, Harvard University Press; London, William Heinemann Ltd. 1918. . Online version at the Perseus Digital Library
 Pausanias, Graeciae Descriptio. 3 vols. Leipzig, Teubner. 1903.  Greek text available at the Perseus Digital Library.

Princesses in Greek mythology
Queens in Greek mythology
Maenads
Companions of Dionysus
Minyan characters in Greek mythology
Thessalian mythology